Tessa Duder  (née Staveley, born 13 November 1940) is a New Zealand author of novels for young people, short stories, plays and non-fiction, and a former swimmer who won a silver medal for her country at the 1958 British Empire and Commonwealth Games. As a writer, she is primarily known for her Alex quartet and long-term advocacy for New Zealand children's literature. As an editor, she has also published a number of anthologies.

Early life and family
Duder was born Tessa Staveley in Auckland on 13 November 1940, the daughter of John Staveley, a doctor and pioneer of blood transfusion in New Zealand who was later knighted, and Elvira Staveley (née Wycherley), a cellist. She was educated at the Diocesan School for Girls in Auckland, and went on to study at Auckland University College in 1958, later returned to the University of Auckland between 1982 and 1984.

After leaving school, Staveley worked as a journalist for the Auckland Star from 1959 to 1964, before travelling to Europe and working for the Daily Express in London between 1964 and 1966. She married John Duder in 1964, and the couple went on to have four daughters. Following the birth of her first child, Duder was a full-time mother for seven years, much of it spent in Pakistan. She returned to Auckland in 1972, where she reentered the workforce as a pianist.

Swimming
As a teenager, Staveley competed in the butterfly and medley swimming events, becoming a national record holder in both events during 1958–59. She won the New Zealand national 110 yards butterfly title in 1957 and 1958, and the national individual medley championship in 1957, 1958, and 1959.

At the 1958 British Empire and Commonwealth Games in Cardiff, Staveley won the silver medal in the 110 yards butterfly, recording a time of 1:14.4 in the final. She was also a member of the New Zealand women's 4 x 110 yards medley relay team, alongside Philippa Gould, Kay Sawyers, and Jennifer Hunter, that finished in fourth place.

Staveley was named New Zealand Swimmer of the Year in 1959.

Writing
Duder began writing fiction in 1977.  Her first novel Night Race to Kawau was published by Oxford University Press in 1982.  Her most successful works are the Alex quartet of novels (Alex, Alex in Winter, Alessandra: Alex in Rome and Songs for Alex) which build upon her own childhood experiences by following a teenage competitive swimmer with Olympic ambitions. The series won three New Zealand Children's Book of the Year awards and three Esther Glen medals.  Alex has been translated into five languages and was for many years Penguin New Zealand's best selling work of fiction.  A film production of Alex was made in 1993.

Duder's later work has been varied, including plays, anthologies and biographies. The Tiggie Tompson Show won the 2000 New Zealand Post Senior Fiction Award for young adult fiction. Her first work for adults, a short story collection Is She Still Alive? reached number two on New Zealand bestseller lists in 2008.
Duder is a past president of the NZ Society of Authors (PEN NZ Inc). In 1990, she was awarded the New Zealand 1990 Commemoration Medal. She was appointed an Officer of the Order of the British Empire in the 1994 New Year Honours, for services to literature, and has been awarded the Storylines Margaret Mahy Medal. She is a trustee of the Storylines Children's Literature Charitable Trust of New Zealand, and a former trustee of the Spirit of Adventure Trust which operates the tall ship Spirit of New Zealand. In 1991, she was the University of Waikato's first writer-in-residence. In 2003, she won the Katherine Mansfield fellowship to work for a year in Menton, France, and in 2007 she travelled to Antarctica under the Artists to Antarctica programme. She was awarded an honorary doctorate by the University of Waikato in 2009. In 2013, she participated in the first Tall Ships Regatta from Sydney to Auckland, sailing aboard Spirit of New Zealand for the eight-day race crossing from Sydney to Opua. In the 2020 Queen's Birthday Honours, Duder was appointed a Companion of the New Zealand Order of Merit, for services to literature.

Duder lives on Auckland's North Shore.

Bibliography

Novels for young people:
 Night Race to Kawau (1982)
 Jellybean (1985)
 Alex (1987)  (US title: In Lane Three, Alex Archer)
 Alex in Winter (1989)
 Alessandra - Alex in Rome (1991)
 Songs for Alex (1992)
 Mercury Beach (1997)
 The Tiggie Tompson Show (1999)
 Hot Mail (2000)
 Tiggie Tompson, All at Sea (2001)
 Tiggie Tompson's Longest Journey (2003)

Short Stories for Adults;
 Is She Still Alive? (2008)

Plays:  
 The Runaway (1993) - one-act play for young actors about Joan of Arc
 The Warrior Virgin  (1996)

Non-Fiction:  
 Kawau - the Governor's Gift (1981)
 The Book of Auckland (1985)
 Spirit of Adventure: the Story of New Zealand's sail training ship (1985) – with Captain Barry Thompson and Clifford Hawkins
 Waitemata - Auckland's Harbour of Sails (1989)
 Journey to Olympia - the story of the Ancient Olympics (1992)
 The Making of Alex: the movie (1993)
 In Search of Elisa Marchetti — a writer’s search for her Italian family (2002)
 Margaret Mahy - a writer's life (2005)
 The Word Witch - the magical verse of Margaret Mahy (editor) - (2011)
 The Story of Sir Peter Blake (2012)
 First Map: How James Cook Charted Aotearoa New Zealand (2019)

References

External links
Official Site

1940 births
20th-century New Zealand novelists
Commonwealth Games silver medallists for New Zealand
Living people
New Zealand children's writers
New Zealand women short story writers
New Zealand women novelists
New Zealand female swimmers
New Zealand Officers of the Order of the British Empire
Swimmers at the 1958 British Empire and Commonwealth Games
New Zealand women children's writers
20th-century New Zealand short story writers
Commonwealth Games medallists in swimming
Swimmers from Auckland
20th-century New Zealand women writers
People educated at Diocesan School for Girls, Auckland
New Zealand women dramatists and playwrights
20th-century New Zealand dramatists and playwrights
Companions of the New Zealand Order of Merit
Medallists at the 1958 British Empire and Commonwealth Games